The Iraqi Turkmen genocide refers to a series of killings, rape, executions, expulsions, and sexual slavery of Iraqi Turkmen by the Islamic State. It began when ISIS captured Iraqi Turkmen land until they lost all their land in Iraq. In 2017, the ISIS persecution of Iraqi Turkmen was officially recognized as a genocide.

Background and lead-up

Iraqi Turkmen 
Iraqi Turkmen are the third largest ethnic group in Iraq. They are of Turkic descent and live in the Turkmeneli historical region, surrounded by Arabs to the south and Kurds to the north. They are divided almost evenly between Sunni and Shia which played a big part in their persecution. They have previously been the targets of massacres such as the Altun Kupri massacre, Gavurbağı massacre, 1959 Kirkuk massacre, and 1924 Kirkuk massacre.

Lead-up 
During the June 2014 Northern Iraq offensive, ISIS captured many lands that are Turkmen-majority or have significant Turkmen populations, such as Mosul, Talafar, Tikrit and parts of Kirkuk and Diyala provinces.

Genocide 
In June 2014, when ISIS first captured Talafar, they abducted 1,300 Iraqi Turkmen, around 700 men, 470 women and 130 children. The ITF stated that only 42 of the 1,300 have returned, with the rest never being seen again. A year later during August 2015 in Mosul, ISIS did a public mass execution of 2,000 people, accusing them of apostasy, then ISIS themselves stated that around 700 of them were Iraqi Turkmen. On June 16, 2014, ISIS massacred 40 Turkmen from 4 different locations, all near the city of Kirkuk. On June 23, 2014, ISIS abducted at least 75 Turkmen from the areas of Guba, Shrikhan, and Tal Afar. Only 2 bodies were found, in a valley north of Guba. 950 Turkmen families fled the areas after ISIS demanded them to leave. Since the attacks, around 90 percent of Talafar's Turkmens have fled, according to residents and local activists. A single 2015 ISIS car bombing in Saladin province took the lives of 40 Turkmen. The ITF stated that the ISIS attacks on Iraqi Turkmens was a strategic ethnic cleansing campaign. Around 200,000 total Turkmen were displaced from their homes. ISIS were also again accused of targeting Turkmens for their ethnicity. 540 Turkmen civilians from Tal Afar went missing, including 125 women, again at the hands of ISIS, and only 22 of them were found again.

An estimated 600 Turkmen women total were captured and used as sex slaves by ISIS. Around 400-500 of them were sent to ISIS makeshift prisons in Syria. In February 2018, a group of women protested outside of a UN Human Rights Office in Kirkuk. They held signs and demanded the Iraqi government to do something to recover around 450 missing Turkmen women, although the protest was ignored. Hasan Turan, leader of the ITF, feared that if the Turkmen women were to return, they would likely become victims of honor killings by their families. He stated that "Many girls won’t return, and I can only hope their families still accept them if they return. They are the victims." Later in 2018, the UN finally recognized the sexual slavery of Turkmen women. An unnamed Turkmen woman, from the small town of al-Alam near Tikrit, who survived ISIS, told BBC Turkish that ISIS separated the single girls from the married women, and began to rape the single girls in front of everyone. ISIS also raped the town's Turkmen-language teacher to the point that she died as a result.

References 

Genocides in Asia
Contemporary slavery
Ethnic cleansing by the Islamic State of Iraq and the Levant
Anti-Turkish sentiment
Sexual slavery
Genocidal rape
Massacres of ethnic groups
People killed by the Islamic State of Iraq and the Levant
Racism in the Arab world
21st-century mass murder
Ethnic cleansing
Ethnic cleansing in Asia
Islam and slavery